The 2023 World Table Tennis Championships will be held in Durban in KwaZulu-Natal province of South Africa.
It will be the 57th edition of World Table Tennis Championships.

It will be the first such event to be held in Africa since 1939 Championship held in Egypt.

Bid 

South Africa was chosen as host after defeating Düsseldorf, Germany by 90–39 votes.

References

External links
 International Table Tennis Federation
 World Table Tennis

World Table Tennis Championships
World Championships
World Table Tennis Championships
International sports competitions hosted by South Africa
Sports competitions in Durban
World Table Tennis Championships
Table tennis